The Swedish island of Gotland has since the early Middle Ages had a large number of churches and chapels.

Medieval churches

There are 92 medieval churches on Gotland; the island has more well-preserved medieval churches than any other part of Sweden. The medieval churches of Gotland constitute a coherent group of medieval architecture and is therefore listed in a separate article.

Churches and chapels of Gotland

References

Bibliography

External links

  Pictures of churches, church ruins and several baptismal fonts in the churches of Gotland
  Panoramic views of the exterior and interior of the medieval churches of Gotland

Sweden religion-related lists
Gotland
Architecture lists